Aghaloo O'Neills is a Gaelic Athletic Association club. The club is based in Aughnacloy and Caledon which encompasses the parish after which the club is named, Aghaloo, County Tyrone, Northern Ireland.

The club concentrates on Gaelic football. A Ladies Gaelic football club of the same name was also in existence during the 1990s.

History
The senior team in 2009 won Division 3 of the Tyrone All-County Football League and were defeated in the final of the Tyrone Junior Football Championship by local rivals Augher St. Mac Cartans in 2008. In 2010 the club competed in Division 2 of the Tyrone All-County Football League and the Tyrone Intermediate Football Championship.

Aghaloo famously lost to derby rivals Clogher in the 2013 Division 3 league.

In 2017 Aghaloo will compete in division 2 of the Tyrone All County Football League and the Tyrone Intermediate Football Championship.

Achievements

 Tyrone Intermediate Football Championship 
 2002, 2005

 Tyrone Junior Football Championship (2)
 1974, 1991

Notable players
Aiden McAnespie

References

Gaelic games clubs in County Tyrone
Gaelic football clubs in County Tyrone